The Infrastructure Planning Commission (IPC) was a non-departmental public body responsible for the examining and in certain circumstances the decision making body for proposed nationally significant infrastructure projects in England and Wales. Created in 2008, its function has been performed by the Infrastructure Planning Unit within the Planning Inspectorate since 1 April 2012.

History
The IPC was established by the Planning Act 2008 and began operating on 1 October 2009 and provided advice and guidance about the application process until its powers to receive, accept and examine applications for development consent came into force on 1 March 2010.

It was abolished by Coalition Government's Localism Act 2011 which transferred its decision making powers in all cases to the relevant Secretary of State. The Act gained royal assent on 15 November 2011 and from 1 April 2012, the acceptance and examination of applications for development consent is dealt with by a new Infrastructure Planning Unit within the Planning Inspectorate.

Function
The IPC examined accepted applications for development consent for proposed projects that meet certain thresholds, as set out in Part 3 of the 2008 Act. In England, its remit covered applications for proposed energy, transport, water, waste water and waste infrastructure projects. Its remit in Wales only covered proposed energy and harbour projects.

The framework for decision-making of applications for development consent was set out in National Policy Statements (NPS). Following the designation of a NPS, the 2008 Act provided jurisdiction for the IPC to decide applications in that field. While an NPS is in draft form, the IPC acted as Examining authority and provided a report of recommendation to the relevant Secretary of State who was to take the decision.

The chair was Sir Michael Pitt and the chief executive John Saunders.

See also
Infrastructure UK

References

Defunct public bodies of the United Kingdom
Department for Levelling Up, Housing and Communities
United Kingdom industrial planning policy
Town and country planning in England
Town and country planning in Wales